This is a list of seasons for the Canterbury-Bankstown Bulldogs rugby league club

Season summaries

Seasons
Sydney-sport-related lists
Australian rugby league club seasons
Australian rugby league lists